Gerald Butler (July 31, 1907 – February 1, 1988) was an English crime, mystery, thriller and pulp writer and screenwriter. He was born on July 31, 1907 and worked as a chemist prior to becoming a novelist. He later worked as a director of an advertising firm. He was sometimes referred to as the "English James M. Cain".<ref>https://www.kirkusreviews.com/book-reviews/gerald-butler-3/mad-with-much-heart "Mad With Much Heart Review" Kirkus Reviews</ref>

He was thirty-three years old when his first novel, Kiss the Blood Off My Hands, was published in 1940 by Jarrolds Publishing. Kiss the Blood Off My Hands became a best-seller and by 1945, it had sold over 232,000 copies in England alone (all during war-time).http://www.royalbooks.com/pages/books/136016/gerald-butler/mad-with-much-heart-first-uk-edition Book cover of Mad with Much Heart, Jarrolds, first publishing. The Digit Books release of Blow Hot, Blow Cold (published in 1960 under the title Choice of Two Women) stated that Kiss the Blood Off My Hands had sold in excess of 750,000 copies. In 1945, American publishers Farrar & Rinehart, were the first to publish one of Butler's novels outside of England. Their first release of Butler's work was his 1943 novel, Their Rainbow Had Black Edges, issued under the title Dark Rainbow. Farrar & Rinehart went on to publish four more of his novels for the American market, between 1946 and 1951.

Following the publication of his first four novels, Eagle-Lion Films bought the film rights to Kiss the Blood Off My Hands in 1946, hoping to shoot it with Robert Donat in the lead. After the option expired, the novel's film rights were sold to actor-turned-producer Burt Lancaster and his business partner, producer Harold Hecht, in mid-1947. The film was the first project for Lancaster's new film production company, Norma Productions (financed by Universal-International), and hit the screens in October 1948. The film starred Joan Fontaine, Burt Lancaster and Robert Newton and was released in some markets under the names The Unafraid or Blood on My Hands, due to censor issues.

Meanwhile, producer/director Mario Zampi approached Butler in 1947 to collaborate on a film noir thriller, The Fatal Night, through his film production company Anglofilm. Butler adapted Michael Arlen's famous short story, The Gentleman From America into a screenplay for the film which was released in April 1948. Butler and Zampi immediately collaborated again for another Anglofilm production, Third Time Lucky; Butler's screen adaptation of his own novel They Cracked Her Glass Slipper. The film was released in January 1949 and was directed by Gordon Parry.

A third Butler novel was turned into a film, Mad with Much Heart, released as On Dangerous Ground by RKO Radio Pictures. It starred Ida Lupino (who was also an uncredited director) and Robert Ryan and was directed by Nicholas Ray. This last film adaption was released in 1951, the same year that Butler's sixth novel, Blow Hot, Blow Cold, was published. He withdrew from the writing industry for nearly twenty years before returning with his last novel, There Is a Death, Elizabeth, published in 1972. He died sixteen years later.

Bibliography
 Kiss the Blood Off My Hands (1940)
 They Cracked Her Glass Slipper (1941)
 Their Rainbow Had Black Edges (1943)
 Mad with Much Heart (1945)
 Slippery Hitch (1946)
 Blow Hot, Blow Cold (1951)
 There Is a Death, Elizabeth (1972)

Filmography

Publication history

Kiss the Blood Off My Hands
 1940 Jarrolds Publishing, England as a hardcover edition
 1940 Nicholson and Watson, England as a hardcover edition
 1946 Farrar & Rinehart, USA as a hardcover edition
 1946 Presses de la Cité, France as a hardcover, under the title "Les Mains Pures", translated in French by Jeanne Fournier-Pargoire (part of the "Cosmopolis" series)
 1946 Dell Publishing, USA as a paperback edition (catalog Dell 197)
 1948 Dell Publishing, USA as a mapback paperback edition, under the title "The Unafraid [Kiss the Blood Off My Hands]" (catalog Dell 242)
 1950 Presses de la Cité, France as a paperback edition, under the title "Du Sang Sur Tes Mains", translated in French by Jean Weil (part of the "Un mystère" series, catalog 4)
 1961 Consol Books, England, as a paperback edition
 1961 World Distributors, England as a paperback edition
 1980 Presses de la Cité, France as a paperback edition, under the title "Du Sang Sur Tes Mains", translated in French by Jean Weil (part of the "Classiques du roman policier" series, catalog 16)
 1987 Carroll & Graf Publishers, USA as a paperback edition
 1997 Éditions Omnibus, France as a paperback, part of the book "Polar années cinquante"They Cracked Her Glass Slipper
 1941 Jarrolds Publishing, England as a hardcover edition
 1947 Éditions du Bateau ivre, France as a hardcover, under the title "Cendrillon Perd Au Jeu", translated by Jacqueline Richard (part of the "Climats" series)

Their Rainbow Had Black Edges
 1943 Jarrolds Publishing, England as a hardcover edition
 1945 Farrar & Rinehart, USA as a hardcover edition, under the title "Dark Rainbow"

Mad with Much Heart
 1945 Jarrolds Publishing, England as a hardcover edition
 1946 Farrar & Rinehart, USA as a hardcover edition
 1947 Éditions Universitaires, France as a hardcover, under the title "Le Cœur et l'Esprit" translated by Henri Richard (part of the "Univers" series, catalog 14)
 1952 Lion Books, USA as a paperback edition, under the title "The Lurking Man" (catalog 81)
 1957 Albatross Books, Germany as a paperback edition

Slippery Hitch
 1946 Jarrolds Publishing, England as a hardcover edition
 1948 Jarrolds Publishing, England as a hardcover edition, repressed edition
 1949 Farrar & Rinehart, USA as a hardcover edition
 1951 Dell Publishing, USA as a paperback edition (catalog Dell 511)

Blow Hot, Blow Cold
 1951 Jarrolds Publishing, England as a hardcover edition
 1951 Farrar & Rinehart, USA as a hardcover edition
 1953 Dell Publishing, USA as a paperback edition (catalog Dell 726)
 1960 Digit Books, USA as a paperback edition, under the title "Choice of Two Women" (catalog R381)

There Is a Death, Elizabeth
 1972 Robert Hale and Company, England as a hardcover edition
 1974 Desch, Germany as a paperback edition, under the title "Der Tod Kommt, Elisabeth''" translated by Luise Däbritz

References

External links
 

1907 births
1988 deaths
British crime fiction writers
British mystery writers
British male novelists
Pulp fiction writers